Millsdale is an abandoned village located in Channahon Township, Will County, Illinois, 
United States.  In 1903, it had a population of 25. In 1946, it had a population of 20. The Santa Fe Railway stopped at Millsdale Station.

References 

Ghost towns in Illinois
Populated places in Will County, Illinois